The University of Northeastern Philippines (UNEP) is a private non-sectarian university located in Iriga, Camarines Sur in Bicol, Philippines.

History
The University of Northeastern Philippines was established in 1948, in the then Municipality of Iriga. It was founded by a young couple named Atty.Felix Ordas- Alfelor Sr. and Dr. Remedios Rigoroso Alfelor as a small school and was first located in a rented property in the town center. Mabini Memorial School, as it was named in the beginning, offered complete high school and degree courses in Education and Liberal Arts.

The school, in a few years, outgrew its space located downtown. The school then bought 17 hectares of land, a former dumpsite, near the town center. It then transferred into the new site and developed the campus, completing it in the early 1960's. It then was renamed Mabini College. Additional degrees were offered and school population even grew more rapidly with the diversified campus offerings.

In 1974, the school received its university charter and was finally named the University of Northeastern Philippines. Four years later, the College of Law opened. It is the only law school in Iriga. Through the years the university continuously opened various programs. UNEP is considered one of the oldest universities in the Bicol Region, and one of the two prestigious universities in the city.

Secondary and Elementary School 
 Junior and Senior High School
 Night High School class
 Grade School

College Undergraduate Programs

College of Law 

 Bachelor of Law

College of Education || PACUCOA Level II Accredited  

 Bachelor of Secondary Education (BSE)
Major in:
 English
 Mathematics
 MAPEH
 Values Education
 Filipino
 Social Studies
 TLE
 Physical Education
 Bachelor of Elementary Education (BEED)

College of Business Education || PACUCOA Level II Accredited 

 Bachelor of Science in Commerce
Major in :  

 Computer Management
 Bachelor of Science in Business Education
Major in:
Financial Management
 Operation Management
 Marketing Management
 Human Resource Management
 Management
 Bachelor of Science in Accountancy
 Bachelor of Science in Customs Administration
 Bachelor of Science in Office Administration
 Bachelor of Science in Entrepreneurship
 Bachelor of Science in Accounting Technology

College of Hotel and Restaurant Management 

 Bachelor of Science in Hotel and Restaurant Management
 Bachelor of Science in Tourism
 Bachelor of Science in Travel Management

College of Arts and Sciences || PACUCOA Level II Accredited  

 Bachelor of Science in Social Work
 Bachelor of Arts in Communication
 Bachelor of Arts in English Language
 Bachelor of Arts in Political Science

College of Engineering and Architecture  

 Bachelor of Science in Electrical Engineering
 Bachelor of Science in Civil Engineering
 Bachelor of Science in Geodetic Engineering
 Bachelor of Science in Electronics and Communication Engineering
 Bachelor of Science in Mechanical Engineering
 Bachelor of Science in Architecture

College of Maritime Education  

 Bachelor of Science Marine Engineering
 Bachelor of Science in Marine Transportation

College of Criminal Justice Education  

 Bachelor of Science in Criminology

College of Nursing  

 Bachelor of Science in Nursing
 Two (2) years Diploma in Midwifery

Graduate school

Masteral Program 

 Master of Arts in Education (MAEd)
Major in:
 Filipino
 Science
 English
 Early Childhood Education
 Guidance and Counselling
 Elementary Education
 Administration and Supervision
 Mathematics
 Master in Business Administration (MBA)
 Master of Public Administration (MPA)

Doctoral Program 

 Doctor of Philosophy (Ph.D)
Major in:
 Human Resource Development
 Doctor of Public Management (DPM)
 Doctor of Business Management (DBM)
 Doctor of Education (Ed.D.)
Major in
Educational Management

Scholarship Program

School-Sponsored Scholarship Program 

 Presidential Scholarship Grant
 Felix O. Alfelor Sr. Scholarship Grant
 Dr. Remedios R. Alfelor Scholarship Grant
 Administrative Scholarship Grant
 Honor High School Graduates Grant
 UNEP Center for Culture and Arts
 Athletic Scholarship Grant

Government Scholarship 

 Madelaine Alfelor-Gazmen (MAGS)
 TESDA Scholarship Grant
 CHED Scholarship Grant
 Education Service Contracting (ESC)
 Ako Bicol Partylist Scholarship Grant
 A Teacher Partylist Scholarship Grant

Private Scholarship 

 College of Nursing International Alumni Association Scholarship Grant
 Doña Gregoria B. Albia Scholarship Grant
 Arch. Jose T. Emila Jr. Scholarship Grant
 Magbinaydan Scholarship Grant
 Sor Maria Asuncion G. Evidente, DC Scholarship Grant
 Philippine Veterans Scholarship (PVAO)

Accreditation
Several programs of UNEP have been accredited by the Philippine Association of Colleges and Universities Commission on Accreditation (PACUCOA). 
Examples of these are the undergraduate programs in the liberal arts,  business administration, elementary and secondary education which have all been Level II-accredited. Meanwhile, graduate programs in education, business administration and public administration have all been accredited under Level I.

Sister Schools

Felix O. Alfelor Sr. Foundation College 
College Acronym : FAFC

School Type : Private

Academic Calendar : Bi-Semestral 

Year Founded : 1986

President: Emmanuel Alfelor

Alfelor Sr. Memorial College 
College Acronym : ASMC

School Type : Private 

Academic Calendar : Bi-Semestral 

Year Founded : 1985

President: Delicia R. Alfelor- Tibi

Buhi Lyceum 
School Acronym : Lyceum

School Type : Private 

Year Founded : 1966

President: Dr. Rupert Alfelor

Partido College 
School Type: Private

Region:Region V

Address: Tambuco St, Goa, Camarines Sur

Year Founded: 1979

President: Mrs. Emma G. Alfelor

References

External links 
 Official website

1984 establishments in the Philippines
Universities and colleges in Camarines Sur
Legal education in the Philippines